Henry Harrington may refer to:

 Henry F. Harrington, editor of the Boston Herald
 Henry Moore Harrington (1849–1876), U.S. military officer during the Native American Wars
 Henry W. Harrington (1825–1882), U.S. Representative from Indiana
 Henry William Harrington (North Carolina general) (1747–1809), Brigadier General in the American Revolution